Vic Gatrell (or V.A.C. Gatrell) is a British historian. He is a Life Fellow of Gonville and Caius College, Cambridge.

Life
Born to working-class immigrant Londoners in South Africa, Gatrell went to state schools in Pietermaritzburg and Port Elizabeth and then to Rhodes University, where he graduated with first-class Honours, and won an Elsie Ballot scholarship to Cambridge. At St John's College he took first-class honours in history and completed his Ph.D. on 'The Commercial Middle Class in Manchester 1820–1857', before becoming a research fellow and then a teaching fellow of Gonville and Caius College.

In the Cambridge History Faculty Gatrell was appointed Lecturer in British Economic and Social History in 1971, and then Reader in British history.  He co-edited The Historical Journal, 1976–1986. He is among the pioneer scholars who have worked on the history of crime and punishment, and then on the history of emotions. He became Professor of British History at the University of Essex 2003–2009. He returned to Cambridge in 2009 as a professorial Life Fellow of Caius, and now lives there.

His The Hanging Tree: Execution and the English People 1770-1868 (Oxford, 1994) won the Royal Historical Society's Whitfield Prize, and was nominated as one of the historical Canon in the Times Higher Education Supplement, 2010.  It is a seminal study of changing attitudes to and emotions about capital punishment across a period of profound cultural change, and it is still in print.

Works
His City of Laughter: Sex and Satire in Eighteenth-century London (Atlantic, 2006) is a study of satirical caricature and manners from 1780 to 1830.  It was joint winner of Britain's premier history prize, the Wolfson Prize for History.  It also won the PEN Hessell-Tiltman Prize, was shortlisted for the Authors' Club Banister Fletcher Award for art history, and was listed for the Samuel Johnson Prize for non-fiction.

His The First Bohemians: Life and Art in London's Golden Age (Allen Lane and Penguin, 2013) is a history of 'proto-bohemian' Covent Garden and the 'lower' art world in eighteenth-century London. It argues for the significance of the arts that celebrated 'real life' in that era.  It was shortlisted for the Hessell-Tiltman Prize.

Each of these books has resulted in extensive television and radio contributions and book festival talks.  In 2010 Alastair Lawrence's BBC4 television series 'Rude Britannia' was underpinned by Gatrell's 'City of Laughter'.

Gatrell's Conspiracy on Cato Street: Liberty and Revolution in Regency London was published by Cambridge University Press in April 2022  and was anticipated in his 2020 lecture on the Cato Street Conspiracy for Gresham College.

Awards and honours

1976 T.S.Ashton Prize of the Economic History Society, winner for 'Labour Power and the Size of Firms in the Lancashire Cotton Industry', Economic History Review, XXX (1), Feb 1977
1994 The Whitfield Prize of the Royal Historical Society, winner for The Hanging Tree: Execution and the English People
1997 Senior Visiting Fellow, Lewis Walpole Library, Yale University
2002 Visiting Fellow, Australian National University, Canberra
2006 Wolfson History Prize, City of Laughter
2006 PEN Hessell-Tiltman Prize, winner for City of Laughter
2006 Authors' Club Banister Fletcher Award in art history, shortlisted for City of Laughter
2006 Samuel Johnson Prize for Non-Fiction, listed for City of Laughter
2010 Times Higher Education Hanging Tree in 'The Canon' of seminal works
2013 PEN Hessell-Tiltman Prize shortlist for The First Bohemians

Select bibliography

Robert Owen: A New View of Society and Report to the County of Lanark (Penguin, 1971)
Crime and the Law: the Social History of Crime in Western Europe since 1500 (Europa, 1980) (with Bruce Lenman and Geoffrey Parker)Crime, Authority, and the Policeman-State', in F. M. L. Thompson (ed.), The Cambridge Social History of Britain 1750-1950, vol. iii, pp. 243 - 310.  
The Hanging Tree: Execution and the English People 1770-1868 (Oxford, 1994) 
City of Laughter: Sex and Satire in Eighteenth-century London (Atlantic, 2006)
Thomas Rowlandson: Pleasures and Pursuits in Georgian England (Vassar College, 2010), by Patricia Phagan, Vic Gatrell and Amelia Rauser (exhibition catalogue and texts)
The First Bohemians: Life and Art in London's Golden Age (Allen Lane, 2013)
Conspiracy on Cato Street: Liberty and Revolution in Regency London (Cambridge University Press, 2022)

References

External links
Staff page on the Essex University website
 Matthew Reisz, 'Past Mistakes', Higher Educational Supplement 15 October 2009
 'Vic Gatrell explains what impels his writing'. History Today, May 2007; https://web.archive.org/web/20150207125307/http://www.wolfson.org.uk/history-prize/previous-winners/. http://www.englishpen.org/events/prizes/hessell-tiltman-prize/
 Gonville and Caius Fellows

Academics of the University of Essex
Fellows of Gonville and Caius College, Cambridge
1941 births
Living people